The 48th Arizona State Legislature, consisting of the Arizona State Senate and the Arizona House of Representatives, was constituted in Phoenix from January 1, 2007, to December 31, 2008, during the first two years of Janet Napolitano's second term in office. Both the Senate and the House membership remained constant at 30 and 60, respectively. The Democrats gained a seat in the Senate, leaving the Republicans with a 17-13 majority. The Republicans maintained their majority in the lower chamber, 33–27, even though the Democrats picked up 6 seats.

Sessions
The Legislature met for two regular sessions at the State Capitol in Phoenix. The first opened on January 8, 2007, and adjourned on June 20, while the Second Regular Session convened on January 14, 2008, and adjourned sine die on June 27.

There were no Special Sessions.

State Senate

Members

The asterisk (*) denotes members of the previous Legislature who continued in office as members of this Legislature.

House of Representatives

Members 
The asterisk (*) denotes members of the previous Legislature who continued in office as members of this Legislature.

References

Arizona legislative sessions
2007 in Arizona
2008 in Arizona
2007 U.S. legislative sessions
2008 U.S. legislative sessions